Paul Joly (born 7 June 2000) is a French professional footballer who plays as a centre-back for  club Dijon on loan from Auxerre.

Professional career
A youth product of Muides, Blois Football 41, and Lorient before joining the reserves Amiens in 2018. He signed his first professional contract with Auxerre on 18 October 2020. He made his professional debut with Auxerre in a 3–1 Coupe de France loss to LOSC Lille on 18 December 2021.

On 16 January 2023, Joly joined Dijon in Ligue 2 on loan until the end of the 2022–23 season.

References

External links
 
 AJA Profile

2000 births
Footballers from Orléans
Living people
French footballers
Association football defenders
AJ Auxerre players
Dijon FCO players
Ligue 1 players
Ligue 2 players
Championnat National 2 players
Championnat National 3 players